Gustave Henri Krafft (29 January 1861 – 13 September 1927; before 1920 also known as Gustav Krafft) was an Alsatian architect and painter, primarily known for his association with Art Nouveau.

Life and career 
With his Strasbourg friend Jules Berninger (also his future brother-in-law), he studied in Stuttgart in 1878–79, then at the École des beaux-arts in Paris from 1881 to 1886 in the atelier of Jean-Louis Pascal. Several years later, having moved back to Strasbourg (then part of the German Empire), he made a name for himself as one of the foremost Strasbourg practitioners of Art Nouveau (Jugendstil in the German-speaking countries). His practice with Berninger benefitted from the expansion of the city, marked by new constructions such as theirs which were much appreciated for their innovative style. He was a member of the Kunschthafe.

The forms of Krafft's early work were characterized by a mix of Renaissance-revival elements. In 1894 he designed the restaurant l'Orangerie. In 1895, he designed the Stöber monument at the wine market in Strasbourg (Weinmarkt). Between 1897 and 1900, Berninger and Krafft built the famous Villa Schützenberger for an Alsatian brewery magnate.

Gustave Krafft showed his art at the salon of the Revue alsacienne illustrée in 1905, at the Galerie Bader-Nottin at 23 rue de la Nuée-Bleue avec Théodore Haas, Léon Hornecker, Albert Koerttgé, Henri Loux, Lothar von Seebach, Charles Spindler and Gustave Stoskopf. He was known for his painting, particularly watercolors, and enjoyed painting landscapes on his trips throughout France, Italy (notably in Capri), Greece, Egypt] and the Near East.

In 1921 (Alsace was returned to France in 1919), Krafft was named professor at the new École régionale d´architecture de Strasbourg and he was named to the Ordre des Palmes académiques. In 1922 in Paris he received the médaille de l'architecture.

His sister Amélie married Karl Hermann Goehrs (1846–1919), a native of Darmstadt, in 1880; Goehrs directed from 1881 to 1919 the Strasbourg branch of the Evangelische Gesellschaft für Deutschland (German Evangelical Society).

Works

References

Bibliography 
 Julien et Walter Kiwior, Le Kunschthaafe. Art, histoire et gastronomie en Alsace, Strasbourg: Associatio A.R.S Alsatiae, 2010. 
 Patrick Hamm et Martine Nusswitz-Kaercher, L'Alsace illustrée à travers les cartes postales, Strasbourg: Éditions du Signe, 2016. 
 Théodore Rieger, "Krafft, Henri Gustave," in the Nouveau Dictionnaire de biographie alsacienne, vol. 22, p. 2097.

External links 
 Gustave Krafft at artprice.com
 Hôtel Krafft
 Gustave Krafft at Archi-wiki.org 

German architects
20th-century French architects
20th-century German painters
19th-century German painters
20th-century French painters
People from Alsace
1861 births
1927 deaths